MSPI may refer to:

 mini-SPI (mSPI), a synchronous serial communication protocol
 MspI, a restriction enzyme used in various methods such as the HELP assay